Zack or Zach may refer to:

People
 Zach (surname), various people
 Zack (surname), various people
 Zack (personal name), lists of people and fictional characters named Zack, Zach, Zac, Zak or Zakk
 Záh (gens) or Zách, a gens (clan) in the Kingdom of Hungary

Places
 Zack, Texas, a formerly populated place
 Zach (crater), on the Moon

Arts and entertainment
 Zack (play), a 1920 play by Harold Brighouse
 Zack, a novel by William Bell

Others
 Tropical Storm Zack (1992), a tropical storm that did not make landfall
 Typhoon Zack (1995), a Category 4 typhoon that hit the Philippines and Vietnam

See also
 Zacks, a surname
 ZAC (disambiguation)
 Žač, a village in Kosovo
 Zac, a list of people with the given name
 Zak (disambiguation)